Joseph Raymond Wolfinger (born October 8, 1985) is an American professional basketball player for Toyoda Gosei Scorpions of the Japanese B.League.

References

External links
The Citadel Bulldogs bio

1985 births
Living people
American expatriate basketball people in Japan
American men's basketball players
Basketball players from Portland, Oregon
Centers (basketball)
Gifu Swoops players
Nippon Tornadoes players
Otsuka Corporation Alphas players
Shinshu Brave Warriors players
The Citadel Bulldogs basketball players
Tokio Marine Nichido Big Blue players
Tokyo Cinq Rêves players
Yokohama Excellence players
Tokyo Hachioji Bee Trains players
Toyoda Gosei Scorpions players
Toyotsu Fighting Eagles Nagoya players
Washington Huskies men's basketball players